Shennan may refer to;

People whose surname is Shennan;

 Bob Shennan (born 1962), British radio executive and BBC Radio 2 Controller (2009-present)
 J. H. Shennan (1933–2015), British historian
 Stephen Shennan, British archaeologist

Places with the name;

 Mount Shennan, a mountain in East Antarctica
 Shennan Road, in Shenzhen, China